Team Stange Racing is an American racing team that competes in the ARCA Menards Series and the NASCAR Cup Series fielding the No. 79 Ford Mustang for Tarso Marques. The team has also previously competed in the IndyCar Series with MotorGator as a sponsor and with Arrow Schmidt Peterson Motorsports as technical team. With Oriol Servià driving, they qualified for the 2019 Indianapolis 500 starting 19th place and finishing in 22nd place.

History

NASCAR 
In March 2022, Team Stange announced that they would field a part-time entry in the NASCAR Cup Series, the No. 79 Ford Mustang GT, beginning at Road America. Tarso Marques was announced as the team's driver. The team's remaining schedule will consist of the Verizon 200 at the Brickyard, Watkins Glen 355, Coke Zero Sugar 400, Bank of America Roval 400, South Point 400, Dixie Vodka 400, and the season finale NASCAR Cup Series Championship Race. Sponsorship will come from crypto currency Dignity Gold. Additionally, it was also announced the team would run a NASCAR Camping World Truck Series race at Sonoma Raceway, although they would end up not entering that particular race. They also intended to race at the 2022 Pennzoil 150 in the Xfinity Series for approval to race in the Go Bowling at The Glen at Watkins Glen International but were not approved to race in the Xfinity Series at Indianapolis Motor Speedway. Nothing has been heard from the team since then, and they ended up not running at all in 2022.

ARCA Racing Series
Team Stange Racing debuted in the ARCA Racing Series in the 2014 season, with Maryeve Dufault, Brian Finney, Buster Graham and Christian Celaya as drivers. In the 2015 season, the team competed in the NASCAR K&N Pro Series East with Christian Celaya and Mike Senica. In 2016 they entered only two races, with John Gustafson and Frank Kimmel as the respective drivers. After a five year absence from the series, the team would announce a return to the series in 2022 with Matteo Nannini driving a part time #46 entry beginning at Mid-Ohio Sports Car Course in July. However, they did not show up at Mid-Ohio.

IndyCar Series
On May 13, 2019, Sam Schmidt, John Stange Jr. and Team Stange Racing with MotorGator as the main sponsor and Arrow Schmidt Peterson Motorsports as the technical team, presents the Spanish veteran Oriol Servià as driver for the car with No. 77.

Having an experience of 10 editions of Indy 500, Servia managed to qualify for the race in the 19th place and finished the race in 22nd place.

Racing results

IndyCar Series

(key)

References

External links
 
 

American auto racing teams
Auto racing teams established in 2012
2012 establishments in Illinois
NASCAR teams
ARCA Menards Series teams
IndyCar Series teams